The canton of Saint-Quentin-1 is an administrative division of the Aisne department, in northern France. It was created at the French canton reorganisation which came into effect in March 2015. Its seat is in Saint-Quentin.

It consists of the following communes: 
 
Attilly 
Beauvois-en-Vermandois
Caulaincourt
Douchy
Étreillers
Fayet
Fluquières
Foreste
Francilly-Selency
Germaine
Gricourt
Holnon
Jeancourt
Lanchy
Maissemy 
Pontru
Pontruet
Roupy
Saint-Quentin (partly)
Savy
Trefcon
Vaux-en-Vermandois
Vendelles
Le Verguier
Vermand

References

Cantons of Aisne